Sir Edward Hales, 1st Baronet (1576–1654) was an English politician who sat in the House of Commons in various years between 1605 and 1648. He supported the Parliamentarian side in the English Civil War.

Family
Edward Hales was the son of William Hales of Tenterden, Kent and Elizabeth Johnson, daughter of Paul Johnson of Fordwich. His paternal grandfather was Edward Hales, third son of John Hales (1469/70 – c. 1540), Baron of the Exchequer, and younger brother of Sir James Hales (c. 1500–1554), Justice of the Common Pleas, whose suicide, the subject of a lawsuit in Hales v. Petit, is thought to be alluded to in the gravedigger's speech in Shakespeare's play, Hamlet.

Career

In 1625, Hales was elected Member of Parliament for Queenborough for one parliament, and then in 1626 was elected MP for Kent for one parliament. In April 1640 he was re-elected MP for Queenborough for the Short Parliament. He was elected again in November 1640 for the Long Parliament, and held the seat until 1648 when he was excluded under Pride's Purge. 
 
Hales died in 1654 at the age of 78.

Marriages and issue
Hales married firstly Deborah Harlakenden, daughter of Martin Harlakenden of Woodchurch, Kent, and through her acquired the Woodchurch estates. He married secondly Martha Cromer, daughter of Sir Matthew Carew, and widow of Sir James Cromer of Tunstall, Kent, and through her acquired the Tunstall estates. She also inherited the manor of 'Herst Hall' in Murston.

His children by his first wife included a son, Sir John Hales, who pre-deceased him. He was then succeeded by his grandson Sir Edward Hales, 2nd Baronet. The latter was a Royalist and supporter of King Charles I, who attempted to raise an army for the King in Kent and was involved in an attempt to free the King when he was imprisoned at Carisbrooke Castle. Having incurred the wrath of both Parliament and his grandfather, the future second baronet fled to the Netherlands.

Footnotes

References
 
 
 

 
 

1576 births
1654 deaths
Baronets in the Baronetage of England
Roundheads
English MPs 1604–1611
English MPs 1614
English MPs 1625
English MPs 1626
English MPs 1640 (April)
English MPs 1640–1648
High Sheriffs of Kent
People from Woodchurch, Kent